Scaphoideini is a tribe of leafhoppers (family Cicadellidae). There are 64 genera and over 600 described species in Scaphoideini.

Genera
There are currently 64 genera described genera in the tribe Scaphoideini:

References

Further reading

External links

 

 
Deltocephalinae
Hemiptera tribes